Boomtown Bossier City (formerly Casino Magic Bossier City) is a hotel and casino located in Bossier City, Louisiana. It is owned by Gaming and Leisure Properties and operated by Penn Entertainment.

History
Casino Magic Corp. merged with Hollywood Park, Inc. in 1998.

Pinnacle Entertainment renamed it Boomtown in 2002.

See also
 Boomtown Biloxi
 Boomtown New Orleans
 Boomtown Reno
 Silverton Las Vegas
 List of casinos in Louisiana

References

External links
 

1996 establishments in Louisiana
Buildings and structures completed in 1996
Casino hotels
Casinos completed in 1996
Casinos in Louisiana
Hotel buildings completed in 1996
Hotels in Louisiana
Riverboat casinos